Tighe Scott (born 2 June 1949) is a retired American racecar driver from Pen Argyl, Pennsylvania. He competed in dirt modified racing before moving up into the NASCAR Winston Cup Series. He had 18 top-ten finishes in 89 races, with a career best 13th-place finish in the 1978 Winston Cup.

Racing career
Scott began as a dirt modified and sportsman driver in Pennsylvania, New York and New Jersey at tracks like Bridgeport, New Jersey and Middletown, New York.

Scott was given the opportunity to race in the 1976 Daytona 500 by car owner Walter Ballard. He started 18th in the race and finished 35th after crashing on the 58th lap. Scott described the experience, "That was the first time I had ever raced on asphalt. My first time on the track, I had no idea what I was up against. It took me a couple days to get myself up to speed." He competed in five more NASCAR races that season. After a sixth-place finish at Talladega Superspeedway, Ballard offered him a full-time ride.

Scott ran 26 of 30 races that season to finish 20th in season points. In 1978, Scott had his highest points finish when he finished 13th in season points.

Scott's father, owner of Scotty's Fashions, hired Harry Hyde to be the crew chief for his family team in 1979 with Tighe Scott as the driver. Their first race together was for the 1979 Daytona 500. Scott blew a tire in his 125 mile qualifying race, so he had to start 33rd in the main event. He worked his way into the top-five in the race. "I was with guys I had never run alongside of before," Scott said. "Our car didn’t have the horsepower they had. I couldn’t lead, but I could run good in the draft." Scott was in third place in the race when he went into the pits for his final pit stop with 30 laps left. He entered the pits at full speed (which was legal and common at that time), and spun from some water on pit row right before his pit stall. Benny Parsons' car was overheating in the pits. It took Scott some time to refire the car and he returned to the track  3/4 of a lap behind the leaders. He was unable to draft with any cars and he went a lap down with one lap left. Richard Petty won the race after the Donnie Allison/Cale Yarborough crash led to a fight in the infield. Scott finished sixth in the race. At the following race at Rockingham Speedway, Scott recorded his best NASCAR result when he finished fourth. His team's lack of funds enabled them to race in only 15 more events that season.

He ran ten races in 1980. Scott's final race was at the 1982 Daytona 500 for Tom Pistone. He started 30th and finished 29th after crashing on the 81st lap. The crash footage was featured in the movie Stroker Ace.

He returned to his roots, racing  sprint cars on Pennsylvania and New York tracks. In 1983 he raced sprint cars at Williams Grove Speedway and Selinsgrove Speedway, and won a race at Selinsgrove. The following season he raced at these and other tracks including Port Royal Speedway and a World of Outlaws (WoO) event at Orange County Fair Speedway.  His final race happened in 1985. That season he competed in four WoO events and won his second last feature in a local event at Williams Grove.

Personal life
As of 2008, Scott runs the construction and excavating business A. Scott Enterprises. He also operates "Scotty's Fashions", a family garment business started by his father. He is married to his second wife, the former Kathy Toman, and he has three sons and four grandchildren.

References

External links
A. Scott Enterprises official website
Scott's Fashions' official website

1949 births
Living people
NASCAR drivers
Racing drivers from Pennsylvania
Sportspeople from Northampton County, Pennsylvania